The Hawke's Bay Cup was an international women's field hockey tournament, held annually in the New Zealand city of Hastings.

Founded in 2014, the Hawke's Bay Cup is an initiative backed by the Hawke's Bay Region tourist industry and many local businesses. The tournament plays a major role in the annual Hawke's Bay Festival of Hockey, which showcases the top talent from around New Zealand.

Of the four tournaments held so far, three teams have lifted the title. New Zealand are the most successful team, having won the title twice. Australia and Argentina are joint second best team, each having won the title once, with Argentina taking home the trophy in the tournament's inaugural year.

The size of the tournament has changed throughout its four years, with 6 teams participating in the 2014 tournament, 8 teams participating in the 2015 and 2016 tournaments, and 4 teams taking part in the 2017 tournament.

New Zealand won the 2017 tournament, taking on teams from Japan, Australia and the United States.

Teams
2017 Tournament Teams

 
 
 
 

Past Tournament Teams

Results

Summaries

Successful national teams

Team Performances

References

External links

 
International women's field hockey competitions hosted by New Zealand
2014 establishments in New Zealand